Azrou (Berber: Aẓro, ⴰⵥⵔⵓ, Arabic: أزرو) (meaning “rock” or “stone”) is a Moroccan town 89 kilometres south of Fez in Ifrane Province of the Fès-Meknès region.

Geography

The market town of Azrou is located at a strategic crossroads of the N13 and N8 roads towards the northern end of the Middle Atlas. The N13 road connects Azrou to Meknes in the north west and Midelt in the south east. The National Route N8 comes from Fes in the north east and continues to Khenifra and then Marrakech in the south west.

Azrou is at an altitude of 1250 m and surrounded by mountains covered with evergreen holm oak and cedar.

The Cèdre Gouraud Forest is located to the south east, where one of the sub-populations of the Barbary macaque, Macaca sylvanus (called magots) is found. In addition to its rich biodiversity symbolized by the famous cedar forest there are the butterflies which are unique in the world. The surroundings of Azrou are a centre of attraction for the residents, hikers, and picnickers of the large neighbouring towns.  These surroundings are also home to the 'Cedre Gouraud' or 'Grand Cedar', a famous tourist attraction. This place is also famous due to the macaque apes that live in the area and are drawn by tourist activity. Moreover, the Azrou forest provides an excellent hiking and exercising environment and also holds several summer camps for children. Azrou urban construction is in the European style (red tile roofs).

The region is also known for its cherry trees, apple trees, fish farms, and the abandoned sanatorium in the surrounding metropolitan area of Ben Smim.

Climate 

Generally, Azrou experiences a warmer climate than Ifrane, because the city is at a lower altitude. Under the Köppen system, Azrou features a hot-summer mediterranean climate (Csa), in spite of its cold winters, not cold enough to be classified as a continental mediterranean climate (Dsa). Thus, winters are moderately cold and snowy, but without substantial accumulation. Summers are hot and moderately dry, which are noticeably wetter than in Ifrane.

Toponymy
Azrou is a geomorphological name taken from the landform of a large rock outcrop (Aẓro, ⴰⵥⵔⵓ, means "rock" or "stone" in the Berber language Tamazight) in the centre of the city.

History

The first record of Azrou village in history in a letter sent by Fernão Taveira to king Manuel I of Portugal. 

Azrou is mostly known for hosting the first high school in the Berber region: the Berber high school of Azrou (now the Tarik Ibn Ziad School). It was built by the French colonial authorities in order to train Moroccans for the colonial administration. It was one of the instruments for the implementation of a Berber Dhahir, which changed the justice system in areas where Amazigh languages were predominantly spoken, excluding these areas from Sharia and the authority of the Makhzen that applied to the rest of Morocco, and implementing a new legal system ostensibly in accordance with Amazigh laws and customs written in French.

The college became an educational institution in the reference area, forming part of the political and military elites from 1956 to 1973, after independence, the college was renamed Azrou Tarik Ibn Ziad High School.

The town was long neglected by the Moroccan authorities since independence in 1956 to the detriment of the nearby town of Ifrane. Although it is the true capital of the Middle Atlas and a town that has given Morocco many leaders and intellectuals, the town still does not officially rank as provincial capital, although it is in practice.

The town has several hotels.

Picture Gallery

Twinning
The city signed a protocol of cooperation with Blois in July 2011
 Blois (France) since 2011.
 Melle (France) since 1996.

Sources

Populated places in Ifrane Province